Sir Alfred John Balcombe, PC (29 September 1925 – 9 June 2000) was a Lord Justice of Appeal from 1985 to 1995.

Career
He was called to the Bar at Lincoln's Inn, 1950 (Bencher, 1977; Treasurer, 1999); he practised at the Chancery Bar, 1951–77.  He was appointed a QC in 1969.  He was a Judge of the High Court of Justice, Family Division, 1977–85.  He was a Judge of the Employment Appeal Tribunal, 1983–85.

He was a member of the Bar council, 1967–71.

He was knighted in 1977 and made a Privy Councillor in 1985.

Other positions held
 Member, Steering Committee for Revenue, Tax Law Rewrite, 1997–98.
 Chairman, London Marriage Guidance Council, 1982–88.
 President, SW London Branch, Magistrates' Association, 1993–2000.
 President, The Maccabaeans, 1990–2000.
 Master, Company of Tin Plate Workers, 1971–72.
 Senior Grand Warden, United Grand Lodge of England of the Freemasons, 1996–98.
 Honorary Fellow, Hebrew University of Jerusalem, 1996

Arms

References

1925 births
2000 deaths
People educated at Winchester College
Alumni of New College, Oxford
20th-century English judges
Lords Justices of Appeal
Knights Bachelor
Members of the Privy Council of the United Kingdom
Royal Corps of Signals soldiers
British Army personnel of World War II
Family Division judges